Here is a 2003 Croatian film directed by Zrinko Ogresta.

The film was first released at the Pula Film Festival on 21 July 2003, where it won the Big Golden Arena for Best Film and Zlatko Crnković received the Golden Arena for Best Actor. In July 2004, it was nominated for the Crystal Globe and won the Special Jury Prize at the 39th Karlovy Vary International Film Festival. It also won the Best Feature Film at the Milan Film Festival, the Krzysztof Kieslowski Award at the Denver International Film Festival, and the Critics Award at the Montpellier Mediterranean Film Festival.

Cast
 Jasmin Telalović - Kavi
 Marija Tadić - Duda
 Zlatko Crnković - Josip
 Ivo Gregurević - Boris
 Ivan Herceg - Karlo
 Nikola Ivosević - Lala
 Miraj Grbić - Žutan

References

External links
 

2003 films
Croatian drama films
2000s Croatian-language films